Brad Kennedy (born 18 June 1974) is an Australian professional golfer. He has won three times on the Japan Golf Tour and five times on the PGA Tour of Australasia.

Professional career
Kennedy turned professional in 1994. He won several minor tournaments in Queensland. In 2003 and 2004 he had a trio of second-place finishes on the European Tour: the 2003 and 2004 Carlsberg Malaysian Opens and the 2004 Madeira Island Open; the first two being co-sanctioned with the Asian Tour, where he was also runner-up in the 2002 Volvo China Open. In 2006 he was third in the Barclays Singapore Open, an important event on the Asian Tour.

Since 2011 Kennedy has played primarily on the Japan Golf Tour where he has won three times. He has also been successful on the PGA Tour of Australasia, winning five times. His most important wins on the tour have been in the New Zealand Open, which he won in 2011 and 2020.

He won the PGA Tour of Australasia Order of Merit for the 2020–21 season.

Personal life
Kennedy is married and has two children.

Professional wins (14)

Japan Golf Tour wins (3)

*Note: Tournament shortened to 54 holes due to rain.

Japan Golf Tour playoff record (0–1)

Asian Tour wins (1)

1Co-sanctioned by the PGA Tour of Australasia

PGA Tour of Australasia wins (6)

1Co-sanctioned by the Asian Tour
2Mixed event with the ALPG Tour

PGA Tour of Australasia playoff record (1–1)

Other wins (5)
1996 Queensland Trainee Championship
1999 Wynnum Open (Queensland)
2000 Bargara Classic (Queensland), Wynnum Open (Queensland)
2001 Bargara Classic (Queensland)

Results in major championships

CUT = missed the half-way cut
"T" = Tied
NT = No tournament due to the COVID-19 pandemic
Note: Kennedy only played in the U.S. Open and The Open Championship.

Results in World Golf Championships
Results not in chronological order before 2015.

1Cancelled due to COVID-19 pandemic

NT = No tournament
"T" = Tied

References

External links

Australian male golfers
PGA Tour of Australasia golfers
Asian Tour golfers
European Tour golfers
Golfers from Sydney
1974 births
Living people